= Marion Gay Wofford =

American politician

Member of the South Dakota House of Representatives from the 13th district
- In office 1979–1988

Personal details
- Born: July 9, 1922 Minneapolis, Minnesota, US
- Died: October 30, 2013 (aged 91) Sioux Falls, South Dakota, US
- Party: Republican
- Profession: businesswoman

Marion Gay Wofford (née Dickinsheets, July 9, 1922 – October 30, 2013) was an American politician in the state of South Dakota. She was a member of the South Dakota House of Representatives from 1979 to 1988. She was a businesswoman. Wofford received her education at the University of Minnesota, University of South Dakota, University of Utah, Western Reserve University and Columbia Presbyterian Medical Center. She lived in Sioux Falls, South Dakota. She died in Sioux Falls, South Dakota on October 30, 2013, at the age of 91.
